The Adventurers' Club of New York was an adventure-oriented private men's club founded in New York City  in 1912 by Arthur Sullivant Hoffman, editor of the popular pulp magazine Adventure. There were 34 members at the first meeting. In its second year, "Sinclair Lewis, Hoffman's assistant, was elected secretary and served three years." Monthly dinner meetings, and weekly luncheons, were the primary functions of the club.

According to club secretary, newspaperman Fred J. Splitstone, the club's "One inviolate rule is that no publicity is ever given to the meetings. It makes men freer to talk." It also makes the club difficult to research. However, soon after making those comments, in 1926, the club began publishing a monthly newsletter, The Adventurer. It ran at least until 1960. Its content primarily concerned club business, e.g. changes in leadership, new members. It occasionally ran profiles—and obituaries—of members. The main content was typically a description of the previous monthly dinner meeting. The speakers were described along with a summation of their speeches.

A weekly CBS radio show, Gold Seal Associates, featuring members of the club describing the most exciting moment of their lives, was inaugurated on June 13, 1930. Major C. E. Russell was the inaugural speaker.

The club was one of at least two such clubs in New York.  The other club was the Ends of the Earth Club, which included Mark Twain as a member.

The club appears to have faded out in the 1970s.

Chapters 

Spin-off clubs were founded in Chicago, Los Angeles, Honolulu and Copenhagen. The Adventurers' Club of Los Angeles remains active, as does the Adventurers' Club of Honolulu (founded in 1954) and the Adventurers' Club of Denmark.

Members 

In 1925, the club had 185 total members, of whom 140 were active. The Adventurers' Golden Jubilee (1964) listed 195 active members and 68 associate members, for a total of 263.

Among the members of the Adventurers' Club of New York were many prominent citizens, travelers, writers, artists and explorers, including the following. Members who attended the first meeting on December 7, 1912, are indicated with "[O]," for original.

 Aage, Count of Rosenborg. Danish prince and officer of the French Foreign Legion.
 Adamson, Hans Christian. Writer; spent 24 days adrift in the Pacific with Eddie Rickenbacker.
 Akeley, Carl. Taxidermist; contributor to natural history museums.
 Aughinbaugh, Dr. William E. A doctor, "a medical hobo," who practiced in perilous places around the globe.
 Bairnsfather, Bruce. British humorist and cartoonist; WWI veteran.
 Barclay, McClelland. Magazine, poster and advertising artist.
 Baldwin, Captain Tom. [O] Pioneer balloonist.
 Bartlett, Bob. Arctic explorer.
 Bedford-Jones, H. Prolific pulp adventure fiction author.
 Braley, Berton. [O] Prolific poet.
 Bruno, Harry. Early aviation promoter.
 Buck, Frank. Hunter, collector of wild animals, and filmmaker.
 Bullard, Robert Lee. Decorated WWI officer.
 Byrd, Admiral Richard E. USN admiral, polar explorer.
 Calvert, E. H. Spanish–American War veteran (Cuba); silent film actor and director.
 Clark, James Lippitt. Explorer, sculptor and scientist.
 Cotlow, Lewis N. World traveler.
 Couzens, H. D. [O] Adventure author.
 Currie, Barton Wood. Author and book collector.
 Curtis, Leland. Artist and explorer.
 De Brissac, Ricardo. Magazine writer and soldier-of-fortune.
 de Prorok, Byron. Archaeologist, anthropologist, explorer and author of travelogues.
 Dingle, Captain A. E. [O] Sea-story author; claimed to be the "very first member . . . at the very first meeting."
 Dunn, J. Allan. Popular pulp adventure and western fiction author.
 Eddy, Clyde. River explorer.
 Duquesne, Fritz. [O] Boer War veteran; big-game hunter; convicted spy.
 Dwyer, James Francis. [O] Popular pulp writer.
 Eagan, Eddie. Summer and Winter Olympic Games athlete.
 Footner, Hulbert. [O] Canoe explorer; prolific author.
 Foran, W. Robert. British Army officer; co-founder of the NY club; established the Chicago chapter.
 Forman, Harrison. World traveler and author.
 Gallery, Daniel V. USN officer; captured U-boat in WWII.
 Grey, Zane. Popular author of westerns.
 Hare, Jimmy. Photojournalist and contributor to Collier's.
 Hawks, Frank. Aviator.
 Henshaw, Neville G. Author.
 Hiller, Lejaren. Illustrator and photographer.
 Hinton, Walter. Early aviator.
 Hoffman, Arthur Sullivant. [O] Editor of Adventure; co-founder of the club.
 Hoffman, Harold G. Governor of New Jersey.
 Holt, George E. US consular official in Morocco. Wrote fiction based in India and Morocco.
 Howden Smith, Arthur D. [O] Historian and Adventure author.
 Hyne, C. J. Cutcliffe. Sea-story author.

 Irwin, Will. Author and journalist.
 Jackson, William Henry. Painter, Civil War veteran, geological survey photographer and explorer.
 Kyne, Peter B. Spanish–American War veteran (Philippines); prolific western author.
 Johnson, Martin. Traveler and filmmaker, with wife Osa; cook on Jack London's yacht, the Snark.
 Law, Frederick Houk. Bicycle traveler and pulp writer.
 Lewis, Sinclair. [O] A. S. Hoffman's assistant editor at Adventure; famous novelist.
 Liebe, Hapsburg. Spanish–American War veteran (Philippines); prolific pulp western author; Adventure contributor.
 Lovfal, Per. Electrical engineer; Arctic explorer.
 Lund, Dane. Spanish–American War veteran (Cuba).
 MacCreagh, Gordon. [O] Traveler, Adventure contributor.
 McCloy, John. US Naval officer and twice Congressional Medal of Honor winner.
 McCurdy, J. A. D. [O] Canadian aviation pioneer.
 Meeker, Ezra. Traveled the Oregon Trail by ox-drawn wagon.
 Mundy, Talbot. [O] Popular adventure-fiction author, prominent in Adventure.
 Pangborn, Clyde. Barnstorming aviator and first pilot to fly non-stop over the northern Pacific Ocean.
 Pierrot, George F. World traveler; host of World Adventure on Detroit radio and television; editor of The American Boy magazine.
 Pond, James B. "Bim". Traveler and lecturer.
 Reynolds, Stephen Allen. [O] Sailor, whaler and soldier; first secretary of the club.
 Ripley, Robert. Cartoonist, famous for Ripley's Believe It or Not!.
 Ritchie, Robert Welles. Journalist, author.
 Roberts, Theodore Goodridge. Author, soldier, and traveler.
 Robertson, George. [O] Automobile racer.
 Russell, Major C. E. Member of the US Intelligence Service and Philippines veteran.
 Schwarzkopf, Norman. Superintendent of the New Jersey State Police.
 Siemel, Sasha. Adventurer, hunter, guide, actor, writer, photographer, and lecturer.
 Steeger, Harry. As head of Popular Publications, published Adventure from July 1934 forward.
 Stephens, Fred. Rocky Mountains trapper and guide.
 Stoloff, Victor. Filmmaker.
 Terhune, Albert Payson. Popular fiction author; famous for the novel Lad, a Dog.
 Thomas, Lowell. Popular journalist and travel writer; brought Lawrence of Arabia to fame.
 Trefflich, Henry. Animal importer and dealer.
 von Hoffman, Carl. Soldier, adventurer, author, and photographer of German ancestry.
 Wallace, Frederick William. Journalist; Adventure contributor.
 Walsh, Henry Collins. [O] First president of the club (1912–17).
 Wells, Carveth. World traveler and lecturer.
 Wells, Linton. Foreign correspondent, world traveler and pioneer broadcaster.
 Wilkins, Sir Hubert. Australian polar explorer, ornithologist, pilot, soldier, geographer and photographer.
 Wirkus, Faustin E. US Marine who ruled Haiti.
 Witwer, H. C. War correspondent and prolific short-story author.
 Wood, Major General Leonard. Distinguished US Army officer.
 Yancey, Lon. USN veteran and history-making aviator.

Speakers 

Notable speakers before the club include the following:

 1926 January 16: Ezra Meeker.
 1926 January 16. Lt. Roland G. Mayer. Survivor of the airship Shenandoah, which crashed in 1925.
 1931 January ??: Frank Buck. Hunter and filmmaker.
 1931 January ??: Owen R. Jones. Accompanist to Adelina Patti.
 1932 December ??: J. Allan Dunn. Adventure pulp writer.
 1936 April 16: Frederick Houk Law. Traveler and writer.
 1936 May 21: J. Allan Dunn.
 1936 May 21: Sasha Siemel. Adventurer, hunter, guide, actor, writer, photographer, and lecturer.
 1936 October 15: Tony Sarg. Illustrator.
 1936 October 15: Leon Dabo. Artist.
 1936 November 19: Martin Johnson. Traveler and filmmaker.
 1936 November 19: Alan Villiers. Author and explorer.
 1936 November 19: Walter Granger. President of the Explorers Club.
 1937 January 21: Attilio Gatti. Italian explorer, author and filmmaker.
 1937 May 20: Julien Bryan. Photographer, filmmaker, and documentarian.
 1938 March 17: Sasha Siemel.
 1938 April 21: William E. Young. Sailor, shark expert.
 1938 May 19: Claus K. Clausen. Decorated US Navy officer.
 1938 December 15: Jimmy Hare. Photojournalist.
 1939 January 19: Ralph DePalma. Dirt track auto racing champion.
 1939 February 16: Jimmy Jemail. NFL player and journalist.

 1939 April 20: Lowell Thomas. Popular journalist.
 1939 April 20: Arch Whitehouse. Prolific aviation fiction pulp writer.
 1939 April 20: Frank Buck.
 1939 May 18: Vilhjalmur Stefansson. Canadian Arctic explorer, President of the Explorers Club.
 1939 October 19: Harrison Forman. World traveler and author.
 1939 October 19: Lon Yancey. US Navy veteran and history-making aviator.
 1940 January 18: Alexander Kerensky. Key figure in the Russian Revolution.
 1940 February 15: Linton Wells. Foreign correspondent and pioneer broadcaster.
 1940 March 21: Sterling Hayden. Sailor and future film actor.
 1940 March 21: Harrison Forman.
 1940 March 21: Harold McCracken. Author and adventurer.
 1940 April 18: David Sarnoff. RCA executive.
 1941 February 20: Harrison Forman.
 1941 May 15: Lewis E. Lawes. Warden of Sing Sing.
 1942 February 19: Harry A. Franck. Prolific travel writer, "prince of vagabonds."
 1942 February 19: Charles B. Whitehead. American flyer in the RAF.
 1942 May 21: Robert Ripley. Ripley's Believe It or Not! cartoonist.
 1942 May 21: Jean Delacour. Bird expert of the Bronx Zoo.
 1954 ??: Fritz Duquesne. "My Life – In and Out of Prison"
 1962 May 16: Carl von Hoffman. Soldier, adventurer and author.

Presidents

Award winners 

The club also awarded medals and honors. Recipients include:

 Sasha Siemel

Gold Medal 

 William O. Douglas (1964). Supreme Court justice; mountain climber.

Bronze Medal 

 Alexander de Seversky (1971)

Life Membership 

 William Willis (1954). Ocean rafter.

Books

Call to Adventure 

In 1935, Robert Spiers Benjamin edited an anthology Call to Adventure. Contributors were:

The Adventurers' Golden Jubilee 
In 1964, the club published The Adventurers' Golden Jubilee 1912–1962: A History of the Adventurers Club of New York.

See also 
 Explorers Club, an extant club of about the same age, also founded in New York, with a scientific mission.

References 

Clubs and societies in New York City
Organizations established in 1912
1912 establishments in New York City